Brett Leland McLaughlin, known professionally as Leland, is an American singer and songwriter. Based in Los Angeles, California, he has worked closely with a range of popular artists, including Selena Gomez, Troye Sivan, Daya, Andy Grammer, Kelsea Ballerini and Allie X. In December 2017, McLaughlin signed with Vertigo Berlin/Universal Music Germany for his career as a singer and is currently published by Sony/ATV Music Publishing.

Discography

Albums

Soundtrack albums

Singles

As lead artist

As featured artist

Guest appearances

Television

RuPaul's Drag Race
Leland co-wrote Kardashian: The Musical, VH1 Divas Live and Kitty Girls featured on the ninth season and All Stars 3 of VH1's RuPaul's Drag Race, and was a guest on the sixth episode of All Stars 3, second episode of All Stars 4, twelfth episode of season 12 and seventh episode of All Stars 6. Leland co-wrote "I'm That Bitch" and "You Think You Know Me" for the first two episodes of the twelfth season.

Leland co-wrote "Break Up (Bye Bye)" and "UK Hun?" for RuPaul's Drag Race UK. He also wrote “Queens Down Under” for RuPaul's Drag Race Down Under.

Love, Victor 
Leland served as executive music producer for the Hulu series Love, Victor, in addition to writing the series' theme song "Somebody Tell Me". He also co-wrote 13 original songs for the series' soundtrack.

The Other Two
Leland co-wrote "My Brother's Gay" and "Stink", and the theme song for the series The Other Two, which was executive produced by Lorne Michaels and created by Chris Kelly and Sarah Schneider, and aired on Comedy Central.

Gayme Show 
Leland served as executive music producer and composer for Gayme Show on Quibi.

Films

Sierra Burgess Is a Loser
McLaughlin composed the score, and wrote 11 original songs with Bram Inscore, for the Netflix original movie Sierra Burgess Is a Loser, directed by Ian Samuels and starring Shannon Purser. The film was released on September 7, 2018.

Boy Erased
McLaughlin composed the theme song "Revelation", featured in the movie and end credits of the film Boy Erased, with Troye Sivan and Jonsi.

Personal life 
Leland was born in Biloxi, Mississippi. He is openly gay.

Songwriting and production credits
 indicates a song that was released as a single.

Awards and nominations

See also 

 List of Rusicals

Notes

References 

1991 births
Living people
Gay singers
Gay songwriters
American male singer-songwriters
American gay musicians
American gay writers
American LGBT singers
American LGBT songwriters
People from Biloxi, Mississippi
Singer-songwriters from Mississippi
20th-century American male singers
21st-century American male singers